The people that are listed below were born in, residents of, or otherwise closely associated with Englewood, New Jersey, United States.

Academics, medicine and science
 Lori Altshuler (1957–2015), Professor at the University of California, Los Angeles Department of Psychiatry and Biobehavioral Sciences
Gordon Park Baker (1938–2002), philosopher
 Carolyn Denning (1927–2016), pediatrician and pioneer in cystic fibrosis treatment
 Josephine English (1920–2011), gynecologist who was one of the first black women to open a private practice in New York state
 Foster Rhea Dulles (1900–1970), journalist, history professor and author
 Gene-Ann Polk Horne (1926–2015), physician and hospital administrator, director of pediatric ambulatory care at Harlem Hospital and professor of pediatrics at Columbia University
 Malcolm McKenna (1930–2008), paleontologist, whose wife, Priscilla, served as mayor of Englewood
 Robert Mills (1927–1999), physicist
 Eli Sagan (1927–2015), clothing manufacturer; lecturer and author in cultural anthropology; political activist; served on the national finance committee for George McGovern's 1972 presidential campaign, a role that earned him a spot on Richard Nixon's Enemies List in 1973
 Margaret Bailey Speer (1900–1997), educator and teaching missionary
 Dorothy Warburton (1936–2016), geneticist

Arts

Authors

 Charles W. Bailey (1929–2012), journalist, newspaper editor and novelist who co-wrote the 1962 best-selling political thriller novel Seven Days in May
 Kevin Baker (born 1958), novelist and journalist
 Alex Berenson (born 1973), novelist and former reporter for The New York Times
 Claudia Cohen (1950–2007), socialite and gossip columnist
 Brian Daley (1947–1996), science fiction novelist
 Anna Dewdney (1965–2016), author and illustrator of children's books, including Llama Llama Red Pajama
 Robert Levithan (1951–2016, class of 1969), writer and HIV/AIDS activist
 Anne Morrow Lindbergh (1906–2001), author and aviator; wife of Charles Lindbergh and daughter of Dwight Morrow
 James Lord (1922–2009), biographer
 Sue Macy (born 1954), author, whose 2019 book, The Book Rescuer, won the Sydney Taylor Book Award from the Association of Jewish Libraries
 William Marchant (1923–1995), playwright and screenwriter, best known for writing the play that served as the basis for the 1957 Walter Lang movie The Desk Set
 Ian O'Connor (born 1964), sports columnist; ESPN radio host; wrote books Arnie & Jack: Palmer, Nicklaus & Golf's Greatest Rivalry and The Captain: The Journey of Derek Jeter
 Upton Sinclair (1878–1968), author; established a commune called Helicon Home Colony in 1906 with proceeds from his novel The Jungle; it burned down in 1907
 David Stout (1942–2020), journalist, who was best known for his work with The New York Times, and author of mystery novels and of non-fiction about violent crime

Fine arts
 Serena Bocchino (born 1960), artist working primarily in the realm of abstract painting.
 Faith Ringgold (born 1930), African-American artist, best known for her narrative quilts
 Frederick Roth (1872 – 1944), sculptor and animalier, well known for his statues of animals, including the statue of the sled dog Balto in New York City's Central Park

Movies, radio, stage and television

 Glenn Anders (1889–1981), actor best known for his work in Broadway theatre
 John Aprea (born 1941), actor, known for his role as "Young Sal Tessio" in The Godfather Part II (1974) and on television as "Lucas Castigliano" on the soap opera Another World
 Julia Barr (born 1949), actress best known for her role on the soap opera All My Children, playing the character of Brooke English
 Shakira Barrera (born 1990), dancer and actor who has appeared in the Netflix series GLOW
 Martin Block (1903–1967), disk jockey who is said to have inspired the creation of the term by Walter Winchell
 Elizabeth Bracco (born 1959), actress
 David Cassidy (1950–2017), actor and musician, best known for his role on The Partridge Family
 David X. Cohen (born 1966), head writer and executive producer of TV series Futurama
 Peter Coyote (born 1941), actor and author, known for films such as E.T. and Jagged Edge
 Vince Curatola (born 1953), played Johnny Sack on the HBO series The Sopranos
 John Fiedler (1925–2005), voice actor and character actor in stage, film, television and radio, known as the voice of Piglet in Disney's many Winnie the Pooh productions, and as Mr. Peterson, nervous patient on The Bob Newhart Show
 Lucy Fisher (born 1949), film producer
 Genie Francis (born 1962), best known for her role as Laura Spencer on General Hospital
 Ivor Francis (1918–1986), actor
 Frankie Grande (born 1983), dancer, actor, singer, producer, television host and YouTube personality
 Zach Grenier (born 1954), actor known for roles in Fight Club and Deadwood, and on Broadway
 Jess Harnell (born 1963), voice actor and singer, best known for voicing Wakko Warner in Animaniacs
 Justine Johnstone (1895–1982), stage and silent screen actress; later a pathologist and was part of the team that developed the modern intravenous drip technique
 Sara Lee Kessler (born 1951), television news reporter
 Alicia Keys (born 1981), singer, songwriter, record producer and actress
 Téa Leoni (born 1966), actress
 Richard Lewis (born 1947), comedian and actor, known for his roles on Anything but Love and Curb Your Enthusiasm
 Bruce McKenna (born 1962), television and movie screenwriter
 Eddie Murphy (born 1961), comedian and actor
 Miles Orman (born 1984), cast member on Sesame Street
 Roscoe Orman (born 1944), television personality Gordon on Sesame Street
 Charles Osgood (born 1933), television personality
 Rick Overton (born 1954), screenwriter, actor, and comedian
 Betsy Palmer (1926–2015), actress
 Sarah Jessica Parker (born 1965), actress, best known for her starring role in HBO's Sex and the City
 Clarke Peters (born 1952), actor; played Det. Lester Freamon on HBO's The Wire
 Aidan Quinn (born 1959), actor
 Savnt (born 1991 as Stephan Marcellus), vocalist and songwriter who competed on the 13th season of NBC's television series The Voice
 Rick Schwartz (born ), film producer
 Al Sharpton (born 1954), civil rights activist and radio talk show host
 Dick Shawn (1923–1987), actor and comedian
 Brooke Shields (born 1965), actress
 Gloria Swanson (1899–1983), actress, best known for the film Sunset Boulevard
 Ellen Travolta (born 1939), actress known for her roles in the film Grease and the 1950s-based sitcom Happy Days
 John Travolta (born 1954), actor, known for films such as Pulp Fiction, Grease and Saturday Night Fever
 Abi Varghese, director and writer, best known for his Netflix released show Brown Nation
 Tom Wright (born 1952), television and theater actor

Music

 Regina Belle (born 1963), Grammy Award-winning singer
 Estelle Bennett (1941–2009), member of the girl group The Ronettes, with her sister Ronnie Spector and cousin Nedra Talley
 Tony Bennett (born 1926), Grammy Award-winning singer
 George Benson (born 1943), jazz singer and musician
 John Bergamo (1940–2013), percussionist and composer
 William Foden (1860–1947), classical guitar composer; lived in Englewood since 1911
 Virgil Fox (1912–1980), organist
 Dizzy Gillespie (1917–1993), jazz trumpeter; lived in Englewood from 1965 until his death in 1993
 Doug Howard (born 1956), musician, vocalist and songwriter; has performed with Touch, Todd Rundgren, Utopia and The Edgar Winter Group
 Ernie Isley (born 1952), guitarist and member of The Isley Brothers
 Marvin Isley (1953–2010), bassist and member of the Isley Brothers
 Serius Jones (born 1982), MC, battle rapper, mixtape awards winner
 Kitty Kallen (1921–2016), singer
 Lil' Kim (born 1975), real name Kimberly Jones, rapper
 Bruce Lundvall (1935–2015), record company executive, best known for his period as the President and CEO of the Blue Note Label Group, reporting directly to Eric Nicoli, the Chief Executive Officer of EMI Group
 Stephan Marcellus (born 1991), musician, singer and songwriter who appeared on season 13 of The Voice
 Yumi Nu, model and singer-songwriter
 Karen O (born 1978 as Karen Lee Orzołek), lead vocalist for the New York City art punk band Yeah Yeah Yeahs
 Clyde Otis (1924–2008), music industry executive
 Margaret Patrick (1913–1994), "Ebony" of "Ebony and Ivory"
 Wilson Pickett (1941–2006), singer
 Sylvia Robinson (1936–2011), singer, record producer, and co-founder of Sugar Hill Records and All Platinum Records
 Slam Stewart (1914–1987), upright bass player who played for Charlie Parker and Art Tatum
 Bob Weinstock (1928–2006), founder of Prestige Records
 Leslie West (1945–2020), musician, singer and guitarist of Mountain
 Matt White (born 1980), singer-songwriter
 Eric Williams, singer and member of Blackstreet

Business and industry
 Robert Bakish (born 1963), President and CEO of Paramount Global
 John Crowley (born 1967), biotech executive who helped develop a treatment for Pompe disease after his children were diagnosed with the condition
 Victor Farris (1910–1985), inventor and businessman; credited with inventing the paper milk carton
 B. C. Forbes (1880–1954), founder of Forbes magazine
 Malcolm Forbes (1919–1990), entrepreneur most prominently known as the publisher of Forbes magazine, founded by his father B. C. Forbes
 David Hoadley (1806–1873), businessman who served as  president of the Panama Railway
 Elaine Romagnoli (1942–2021), owner of several lesbian bars in New York City
 Daniel E. Straus (born 1957), business executive who is co-founder of CareOne LLC and Vice Chairman of the Memphis Grizzlies
 Cyma Zarghami (born 1962), president of Nickelodeon and MTV Networks' Kids & Family Group

Government and politics

 Byron Baer (1929–2007), politician who served in the New Jersey General Assembly from 1972 to 1993 and in the State Senate from 1994 to 2005
 Shmuley Boteach (born 1966), Orthodox rabbi; radio and television host; author; ran for Congress in 
 Wayne A. Cauthen (born 1955), current and first appointed African American City Manager of Kansas City, Missouri
 Orestes Cleveland (1829–1896), Mayor of Jersey City 1864–1867 and 1886–1892; member of the U.S. House of Representatives from New Jersey's 5th congressional district, 1869–1871
 Ron de Lugo (1930–2020), first Delegate from the United States Virgin Islands to the House of Representatives
 S. Fitzgerald Haney (born 1969), diplomat who served as United States Ambassador to Costa Rica
 Alexander L. Jackson (1891–1973), African American business owner and civic leader, who was co-founder of the Chicago Urban League, and general manager of The Chicago Defender
 Jon Leibowitz (born 1958), chairman of the Federal Trade Commission
 Michael Leiter, Director of the National Counterterrorism Center
 Dwight Morrow (1873–1931), former United States Senator; United States Ambassador to Mexico; father-in law of Charles Lindbergh; namesake of Dwight Morrow High School
 Sybil Moses (1939–2009), prosecutor of the "Dr. X killings" case; New Jersey Superior Court judge
 Malcolm Muir (1914–2011), former district court judge for the United States District Court for the Middle District of Pennsylvania
 Dan Fellows Platt (1873–1937), art collector and expert; Mayor of Englewood (1904–1905)
 Sylvia Pressler (1934–2010), Chief Judge of the Appellate Division the New Jersey Superior Court for five years, officially retiring from the bench in 2004
 Bill Rosendahl (1945–2016), politician who served on the Los Angeles City Council
 Steve Rothman (born 1952), former congressmen who served as the Mayor of Englewood from 1983–1989
 Peter F. Secchia (1937–2020), businessman and diplomat who served as the United States Ambassador to Italy from 1989 to 1993
 Sister Souljah (born 1964), rapper and activist
 Walter Scott Taylor, Sr., clergyman, civil rights advocate and first African-American mayor of Englewood
 Susan Thomases (born 1944), attorney; personal counsel and informal adviser to Hillary Clinton during the Clinton presidency
 Robert Torricelli (born 1951), former U.S. Senator; resided in Englewood throughout his career of elective political office
 Alexander Buel Trowbridge (1929–2006), former United States Secretary of Commerce
 Austin Volk (1919–2010), former Mayor of Englewood during the 1967 civil unrest; former New Jersey assemblyman
* Rachel Wainer Apter, lawyer who was nominated in March 2021 to be an Associate Justice of the Supreme Court of New Jersey
 Michael Wildes (born 1964), immigration lawyer who served as Mayor of Englewood from 2004 to 2010
 Craig Zucker (born 1975), member of the Maryland State Senate

Sports

 Jack Armstrong (born 1965), former Major League Baseball right-handed pitcher
 Sean Banks (born 1985), professional basketball player
 Alejandro Bedoya (born 1987), professional soccer player for Philadelphia Union
 Gregg Berhalter (born 1973), former professional soccer player; head coach of the United States men's national soccer team
 Ruben Brown (born 1972), guard for 13 seasons in the NFL for the Buffalo Bills and Chicago Bears
 Dick Button (born 1929), Olympic ice skater and commentator; ranked No. 11 on the Sports Illustrated list of "The 50 Greatest New Jersey Sports Figures"
 Nick Catone (born 1981), mixed martial artist who fights in the Ultimate Fighting Championship middleweight division
 Bruce Delventhal, retired ice hockey player, coach and administrator who led two ice hockey programs before becoming the athletic director for Plattsburgh State
 Garrett Dickerson (born 1995), tight end for the New York Giants
 Joe Echols (–1977), American football coach, college athletics administrator and Negro league baseball player
 Devin Fuller (born 1994), wide receiver for the Atlanta Falcons of the National Football League
 Germain Glidden (1914–1999), national squash champion, painter, muralist, cartoonist and founder of the National Art Museum of Sport
 Bruce Harper (born 1955), former professional football player for the New York Jets
 Chris Hewitt (born 1974), former NFL  defensive back who played for the New Orleans Saints
 Richie Incognito (born 1983), guard for the Buffalo Bills of the National Football League
 Janet Jacobs (born 1928), All-American Girls Professional Baseball League player
 Jimmie Jones (born 1947), former American football defensive end in the National Football League for the New York Jets and the Washington Redskins
 Rob Kaminsky (born 1994), MLB pitcher who has played for the St. Louis Cardinals
 Ross Krautman (born 1991), placekicker for the Syracuse Orange football team
 Pierre McGuire (born 1961), sportscaster and sports commentator
 Liliko Ogasawara (born 1972), judoka who represented the United States in Judo at the 1996 Summer Olympics
 Maureen Orcutt (1907–2007), pioneer golfer and reporter for The New York Times who had 65 career amateur victories. Inducted into New Jersey Golf Association and New York State Halls of Fame. Named Women's Metropolitan Golf Association's Player of the Century
 Bill Parcells (born 1941), NFL Head Coach, formerly of the New York Giants and New York Jets
 Phil Pepe (1935–2015), baseball writer and radio voice who spent more than five decades covering sports in New York City
 Ethel Bliss Platt (1881–1971), U.S. tennis doubles champion in 1906, wife of Dan Fellows Platt
 Jim Price (born 1966), former professional football tight end
 Richie Scheinblum (1942–2021), Major League Baseball All Star outfielder
 Paul Stoeken (born 1975), windsurfer who represented the United States Virgin Islands at the 1996 Summer Olympics and the 2000 Summer Olympics
 Lou Tepe (born 1930), offensive lineman for three seasons with the Pittsburgh Steelers
 Jordan Theodore (born 1989), professional basketball player who currently plays for the Frankfurt Skyliners of the German Basketball League
 Tony Tolbert (born 1967), former NFL player for the Dallas Cowboys
 Ron Villone (born 1970), pitcher for the New York Yankees and 11 other teams during his MLB career
 Bill Willoughby (born 1957), former NBA basketball player; the first NBA player drafted out of high school when he was selected by the Atlanta Hawks in 1975
 John Winkin (1919–2014), baseball coach, scout, broadcaster, journalist and collegiate athletics administrator; led the University of Maine Black Bears baseball team to six College World Series berths in an 11-year span
 Emily Wold (born 1994), former field hockey player, who played as a midfielder

Other
 Clifford Whittingham Beers (1876–1943), founder of the American mental hygiene movement
 George B. Cheever (1807–1890), abolitionist minister and writer
 Sophie Clark (1943–1962), the only African American victim of the Boston Strangler, Albert DeSalvo
 Arthur Hertzberg (1921–2006), Conservative rabbi and prominent Jewish-American scholar and activist
 Dr. John Lattimer (1914–2007), urologist; conducted extensive research on the Lincoln and Kennedy assassinations
 Charles Lindbergh (1902–1974), aviator
 Bernarr Macfadden (1868–1955), physical culture advocate
 Calvin J. Spann (1924–2015), an original Tuskegee Airman and fighter pilot with the 100th Fighter Squadron of the 332nd Fighter Group

References

 
Englewood